Analysis is the process of observing and breaking down a complex topic or substance into smaller parts to gain a better understanding of it.

Analysis may also refer to:

 Analysis (journal), a major international journal of philosophy
 Analysis (radio programme), a half-hour BBC Radio 4 documentary programme
 Data analysis
 Market analysis, the study of the attractiveness and the dynamics of a market within an industry
 Mathematical analysis
Complex analysis
Real analysis
 Philosophical analysis
 Political feasibility analysis 
 Psychoanalysis

See also 
 Analytical skill
 Analytic (disambiguation)
 Synthesis (disambiguation)